Museville is an unincorporated community in Muskingum County, in the U.S. state of Ohio.

History
A post office called Museville was established in 1873, and remained in operation until 1902. Besides the post office, Museville had several shops and a country store.

References

Unincorporated communities in Muskingum County, Ohio
1873 establishments in Ohio
Populated places established in 1873
Unincorporated communities in Ohio